Josep Mestres i Miquel (1868 - 1949) was a Spanish doctor, politician, and agronomist. Born in Vilallonga del Camp, he was president of Tarragona Province from (1913-1915) under the Unión Federal Nacionalista Republicana (UFNR) and was part of the first Executive Council of the Commonwealth of Catalonia. He also served as president of the Association of Physicians of the Province of Tarragona and president of the Official College of Physicians of the province of Tarragona.

References

Politicians from Catalonia
Spanish agronomists
1868 births
1949 deaths
People from Tarragonès
19th-century Spanish physicians
20th-century Spanish physicians